Jeffrey Vincent Mullins (born March 18, 1942) is an American retired basketball player and coach. He played college basketball with the Duke Blue Devils and in the National Basketball Association (NBA) with the St. Louis Hawks and Golden State Warriors. Mullins served as the head basketball coach at the University of North Carolina at Charlotte from 1985 to 1996.

Playing career
Mullins, a native of Lexington, Kentucky, was a very talented 6'4" (1.93 m) forward in high school. After graduation, he attended Duke University from 1960 through 1964, where he averaged 21.9 points per game for his career. His no. 44 Duke jersey was retired in 1994. In 2002, Mullins was named to the ACC 50th Anniversary men's basketball team as one of the 50 greatest players in Atlantic Coast Conference history.

Mullins was a member of the United States Olympic basketball team that won the gold at the 1964 Summer Olympics.

Mullins was taken by the St. Louis Hawks in the first round (5th pick overall) of the 1964 NBA draft. After two lackluster seasons with the Hawks he moved to the Golden State Warriors where he enjoyed the best seasons of his career and was selected as an NBA All-Star three times – in 1969, 1970, and 1971. He helped the Warriors to the 1967 Western Conference title and the 1975 NBA championship. Upon his retirement in 1976 he had amassed a total of 13,017 points for a twelve-year career average of 16.2 points per game.

Coaching career
In 1985, Mullins was hired as the head men's basketball coach and athletic director at UNC Charlotte. The program had struggled since making the NCAA Final Four in 1977, and in three years Mullins took the 49ers back to the NCAA Tournament for the first time since their 1977 run. His 182 victories over eleven seasons stood as a school record until Bobby Lutz, Mullins' former assistant coach, surpassed that total in 2008.

During Mullins' tenure, the 49ers played in three conferences: the Sun Belt (1985–1991), the Metro Conference (1991–1995), and Conference USA (1995–1996).

Head coaching record

References

External links

 Jeff Mullins' statistics at Duke
 NBA Statistics for Jeff Mullins

1942 births
Living people
All-American college men's basketball players
American men's basketball players
Basketball coaches from Kentucky
Basketball players at the 1964 Summer Olympics
Basketball players from Lexington, Kentucky
Charlotte 49ers athletic directors
Charlotte 49ers men's basketball coaches
Chicago Bulls expansion draft picks
College men's basketball head coaches in the United States
Duke Blue Devils men's basketball players
Golden State Warriors players
Medalists at the 1964 Summer Olympics
National Basketball Association All-Stars
Olympic gold medalists for the United States in basketball
Parade High School All-Americans (boys' basketball)
People from Astoria, Queens
San Francisco Warriors players
Shooting guards
Sportspeople from Lexington, Kentucky
Sportspeople from Queens, New York
Basketball players from New York City
St. Louis Hawks draft picks
St. Louis Hawks players
United States men's national basketball team players